The Conference on World Affairs (CWA) is an annual conference, open to the public, featuring panel discussions among experts in international affairs and other areas, hosted since 1948 by the University of Colorado Boulder in Boulder, Colorado, USA.

History
The Conference was founded in 1948 by Howard Higman, a professor of sociology at the university. He ran the conference until he retired, shortly before his death in 1995. The Conference resumed in 1996 and was directed for 16 years by Professor James Palmer, currently by John Griffin.

In mid-March 2020, with ever-increasing public health concerns about the COVID-19 pandemic, CWA announced the cancellation of the April event - the 72nd conference. It left open the possibility of rescheduling the conference if the situation improved sufficiently, which never came to fruition.

Content and panelists
The conference started out as a forum on international affairs, but under Higman, it had morphed into a discussion on a multitude of topics. The core of the conference consists of panel discussions, usually with 3–6 panelists, on topics such as music, art, literature, environmental activism, business, science, journalism, diplomacy, technology, spirituality, the film industry, pop culture, visual arts, politics, medicine, and human rights. Half of a panel typically consists of experts on that panel's subject, and half with people having no professional connection to the topic, who offer fresh perspectives and insight. Only a one-line topic for the panel is announced two or three weeks before the conference. The panelists are given no other direction or guidance about what they should say.

Each year the conference hosts over 100 panelists, and conducts over 200 sessions. All sessions are free and open to the public and are held in rooms varying in capacity according to anticipated popularity, from 50 seats to 2000. The total annual attendance of all the events at the 62nd Conference on World Affairs (in April, 2010) was estimated to be over 92,000. Numerous distinguished people have served as panelists over the years, including Patch Adams, Margot Adler, Betty Dodson, Buckminster Fuller, Temple Grandin, Werner Herzog, Adam Hochschild, Arianna Huffington, Andy Ihnatko, Molly Ivins, Henry Kissinger, Charles Krauthaummer, Paul Krugman, George McGovern, William Nack, Ralph Nader, Howard Nemerov, Yitzhak Rabin, Eleanor Roosevelt, Seth Shostak, Julia Sweeney, Studs Terkel, and Ted Turner.

The CWA is governed by a board selected by both community volunteers and by the university administration, and includes volunteers, faculty members, and students. .

Cinema Interruptus

One of the events of the conference is the Cinema Interruptus, hosted for many years by film critic Roger Ebert. Ebert selected one movie and showed it late afternoon at the beginning of the week, in a normal, uninterrupted way.  Then, for a total of 8 hours spread over the following four afternoons, the movie was dissected almost on a frame-by-frame basis. Ebert, or anybody else in the audience, could pause the movie at any point and comment about any aspect: plot points, acting or directing techniques, camera movement, frame composition, etc.

Roger Ebert moderated Cinema Interruptus from 1969 to 2006. In 2008, he shared an explanation on the program's beginnings:

While Ebert was recovering from cancer surgeries in 2007 and 2008, RogerEbert.com founding editor and CWA participant Jim Emerson stepped in to moderate during his absence. Ebert returned for 2009 and 2010, but mainly as a contributor, using his computer as his voice in order to participate.

In 2009, after cancer robbed him of his ability to speak, Ebert invited the director Ramin Bahrani to go through his Chop Shop using the Interruptus method: "The smallest details of the film reflected the vision of Bahrani and his cinematographer, Michael Simmonds. He explained why each shot was chosen. How each was choreographed. How the plot, which seems to unfold in a documentary fashion, has a three-act structure, a character arc, and deliberate turning points. Why there was a soccer sticker on the back of a pickup truck."

Bahrani told Ebert he'd do anything to meet Werner Herzog, so they "conspired to lure Werner to Boulder in 2010, where he joined Ramin in a shot-by-shot analysis of Aguirre, the Wrath of God." In his memoir Life Itself, Ebert writes that "Although I couldn't speak, it was an inspiring experience for me, bringing these two men together in the act of watching a great film... I was deeply satisfied every afternoon by the Interruptus sessions, and at some point that week I realized it would be my last trip to Boulder. I had come the first time forty years earlier. As I watched a great director whose career I'd admired from 1968, and another who had emerged in the last few years, I thought that was symbolism enough. I gave Interruptus a push and knew it could sail on its own. I felt good that Herzog had been in my life close to the beginning and now probably close to the end and had never made an unworthy film. I don't think Bahrani will make one, either. Artists like them bring meaning to my life, which has been devoted in such large part to films of worthlessness."

In 2011, Ebert announced that he would not be returning, and Emerson would carry on as moderator.

The Cinema Interruptus film-viewing process started in 1975 and continues to the present. After Ebert's passing in 2013, the event was named Ebert Interruptus. In 2016, the critic and Filmspotting podcast host Josh Larsen made his Interruptus debut with Wes Anderson's Rushmore. Larsen is the Interruptus host as of this writing.

Interruptus Films from 1975 to the present, from Boulder Weekly film critic Michael Casey.

1975, Citizen Kane

1976, Notorious

1977, The Third Man

1978, 8½

1979, La Dolce Vita Ebert announced a plan to analyze Fellini's film at the conference every ten years or so.

1980, Amarcord

1981, Cries and Whispers

1982, Taxi Driver

1983, La Dolce Vita

1984, Ebert showed six films: "God’s Angry Man,” “Huie’s Sermon,” The Bitter Tears of Petra Van Kant, My Dinner With Andre, Gates of Heaven and “Werner Herzog Eats His Shoe”

1985, Casablanca

1986, The Treasure of the Sierra Madre

1987, 3 Women

1988, The Third Man

1989, Out of the Past

1990, Raging Bull

1991, Citizen Kane

1992, The Silence of the Lambs

1993, JFK

1994, La Dolce Vita

There was no CWA this year

1996, Pulp Fiction

1997, Fargo

1998, Dark City

1999, Vertigo

2000, Casablanca

2001, Fight Club

2002, Mulholland Drive

2003, Floating Weeds, in addition to Tokyo-Ga, a documentary by Wim Wenders about director Yasujirō Ozu

2004, La Regle de Jeu

2005, La Dolce Vita

2006, The Long Goodbye

2007, Chinatown Jim Emerson filled in while Ebert recovered from surgery

2008, No Country For Old Men Jim Emerson again filled in for Ebert

2009, Chop Shop Ebert and Emerson were joined by the film's director, Ramin Bahrani

2010, Aguirre, the Wrath of God Ebert, Emerson and Bahrani were joined by the film's director, Werner Herzog. This was Ebert's last year at the Conference.

2011, A Serious Man Jim Emerson resumed his role as moderator

2012, Tinker Tailor Soldier Spy hosted by Jim Emerson

2013, One Flew Over the Cuckoo's Nest hosted by the playwright and screenwriter Terrence McNally

2014, The Graduate hosted by David Bender

2015, A Face in the Crowd hosted by David Bender

2016, Sunrise: A Song of Two Humans hosted by the critic Howie Movshovitz

2017, Rushmore hosted by Josh Larsen

2018, Mad Max: Fury Road hosted by Josh Larsen

2019, WALL-E  hosted by Josh Larsen. Larsen also showed Charlie Chaplin's short The Rink and clips from Hello, Dolly! and 2001: A Space Odyssey 

2020 No conference due to the COVID-19 pandemic

2021, Lover's Rock, hosted virtually by Josh Larsen

2022, Jaws, hosted in person by Josh Larsen. Larsen showed clips from Creature From the Black Lagoon and The Spirit of Saint Louis

Jazz Concert
One of the signature events is a free jazz concert featuring performers from around the world. Past performers have included vocalist Cyrille Aimée, bassist Bijoux Barbosa, pianist Henry Butler, trumpeter and multi-instrumentalist Brad Goode and saxophonist Ernie Watts.

In his memoir Life Itself, Ebert concludes his chapter on the conference with a description of the 2009 concert:"Every year there is a jazz concert featuring world-class professional musician, performing for free, convened by the Grusin brothers, Dave and Don. I have heard a set of bongo drums played by Rony Barrak more rapidly and with more precision than I have ever heard before. I heard the flautist Nestor Torres playing Bach with all his heart and then segueing into Latin jazz with songs he composed especially for the conference.

During one song, the charismatic jazz vocalist Lillian Boutté, from Germany out of New Orleans, was so happy that people started dancing in the aisles. People, from my knowledge, from sixteen to eighty...They were feeling elevation. They weren't smiling. They were grinning like kids. On the stage, the musicians were grinning, too. There was a happiness storm in old Macky Auditorium. After all their paid gigs in studio recording sessions, how often do fourteen gifted improvisational jazz and Latin artists get together to jam together just for fun? All free, all open to the public." In the past, there have been master classes and jam sessions featuring musicians visiting the CWA for the jazz concert and students in the University's Thompson Jazz Studies Program.

The 2021 CWA Jazz Concert was hosted virtually and can be viewed on YouTube.

References

External links
 
 Roger Ebert on CWA 2009
 Conference on World Affairs Audio Archive. University Archives, University of Colorado Boulder
 How People in Boulder Build Community out of a Conference. The Atlantic

University of Colorado Boulder
Culture of Boulder, Colorado
International conferences in the United States
Recurring events established in 1948
1948 establishments in Colorado
Roger Ebert
Siskel and Ebert